Mr Beast, released in 2006,   is the fifth studio album by Scottish post-rock group Mogwai.

Overview
The album Mr Beast was released on 6 March 2006 in the UK and 7 March 2006 in the United States, in double LP vinyl format, a regular CD jewel case edition and limited deluxe edition package that comes with both the album on CD and a DVD documenting the recording process entitled The Recording of Mr Beast. The album has been described by Creation Records head Alan McGee as

referring to the influential 1991 album by My Bloody Valentine. Drummer Martin Bulloch describes it as

The album's title stemmed from an incident where Barry Burns and Dominic Aitchison landed in Florida to start a tour with The Cure in 2005, when they saw a taxi driver standing outside the airport holding a sign that said "Mr. and Mrs. Beast" which, after a 10-hour flight, was "funnier than life itself".

Artwork
The cover artwork for Mr Beast is a painting by Amanda Church entitled "Milkbar", and the accompanying booklet contains other works from her, all of a similar style. In addition, the Mogwai Young Team logo is displayed on the spine of the deluxe edition release, with a silhouette of Jesus on the cross visible within the logo.

Track listing
All songs were written by Stuart Braithwaite, Dominic Aitchison, Martin Bulloch, John Cummings, and Barry Burns.  Lyrics on "I Chose Horses" written by  Envy vocalist Tetsuya Fukagawa.

Personnel
Mogwai
Stuart Braithwaite – guitar, vocals on "Acid Food"
Dominic Aitchison – bass guitar
Martin Bulloch – drums
John Cummings – guitar
Barry Burns – piano, guitar, flute, vocals on "Travel Is Dangerous", vocoder

Additional personnel
Craig Armstrong – keyboard on "I Chose Horses"
Tetsuya Fukagawa – vocals on "I Chose Horses"
Tony Doogan – producer

Charts

References

2006 albums
Mogwai albums
Matador Records albums
PIAS Recordings albums
Albums produced by Tony Doogan